Latifi may refer to:

 Latifi (surname), an Arab-based surname, including a list of persons by this name
 Latifî (1491–1582), Ottoman poet
 Latifi, a city in the Central District of Larestan County, Fars Province, Iran

See also
 Montivipera latifii (Latifi's viper), a snake
 Latif (disambiguation)